German patent law is mainly governed by the Patents Act and the European Patent Convention (EPC).

Obtaining patent protection
A patent covering Germany can be obtained through four different routes: through the direct filing of a national patent application with the German Patent and Trade Mark Office (direct national route), through the filing of a European patent application (EPO route), or through the filing of an international application under the Patent Cooperation Treaty followed by the entry into either the European phase (the so-called "Euro-PCT" route) or the national (German) phase of said international application. The German patent has a term of 20 years.

Litigation
The German patent litigation system is one of the few patent systems in which the issue of patent infringement and of patent validity are dealt with by different courts. The district courts, such as the Düsseldorf Regional Court, the Munich Regional Court, and the Mannheim Regional Court, deal with infringement, whereas the Federal Patent Court is in charge of deciding the validity of patents. Such a system is sometimes dubbed a "bifurcation system."

See also
 Rote Taube ("Red Dove"), a landmark decision of the Federal Court of Justice (X ZB 15/67, 27 March 1969)

References

External links
 Patent Act